Gelsenkirchen-Hassel is a railway station on the Gelsenkirchen-Buer Nord–Marl Lippe railway in Gelsenkirchen in the German state of North Rhine-Westphalia. It is classified by Deutsche Bahn as a category 6 station. It was opened on 27 September 1968. It has a platform on the west side of the track. It can be reached via stairs and a ramp.

It is served by Rhine-Ruhr S-Bahn line S 9 at 60-minute intervals. Haltern am See, Marl, Gladbeck, Bottrop, Essen, Wuppertal

It is also served by bus route 243 (Buer + Bertlich – Westerholt – Herten, at 60-minute intervals) and taxibus service 240 (to Polsum at 60-minute intervals).

References 

S9 (Rhine-Ruhr S-Bahn)
Rhine-Ruhr S-Bahn stations
Buildings and structures in Gelsenkirchen
Railway stations in Germany opened in 1968